"Mz. Hyde" is a song by the hard rock band Halestorm. It is taken from their second album, The Strange Case Of... and was released as a single on October 21, 2013. The music video for the song was released to YouTube on February 4, 2014.

According to Lzzy Hale, she wrote "Mz. Hyde" as a reflection of having two sides to her life, both on and off stage—she said that "For years I've been writing about these two sides of myself, and I wanted to capture that in a song." The title is an allusion to the classic novel Strange Case of Dr Jekyll and Mr Hyde.

Charts

References

2012 songs
Halestorm songs
Songs written by Lzzy Hale
Songs written by Scott Stevens (singer)
Works based on Strange Case of Dr Jekyll and Mr Hyde